The 1962 Mysore State Legislative Assembly election was held in the Indian state of Mysore (currently Karnataka) to elect 208 members to the Mysore Legislative Assembly.

Results 

|-
!colspan=10|
|-
!colspan=2|Political Party
!Contestants
!Seats won
!Seat change
!Votes
!Vote share
!Net change
|-style="background: #90EE90;"
| ||208||138|| 12||3,164,811||50.22%|| 1.80
|-
| ||84||20|| 2||887,363||14.08%|| 0.02
|-
| ||59||9||||450,713 ||7.15%||
|-
| ||6||6||||136878||2.17%||
|-
| ||17||4||||159,545||2.53%||
|-
|  || 31 || 3 ||  || 143835 || 2.28%
|-
|  || 9 || 1 ||  || 62809 || 1.00%
|-
| ||||27|| 9||1,091,011||17.31%||N/A
|-
!colspan=2|Total!!!!208!!!!''''''!!!!
|-
|}

Elected members

References 

State Assembly elections in Karnataka
Mysore
Government of Mysore